{{Automatic taxobox
| fossil_range = Late Ordovician-Mid Devonian~
| image = Odontopleura ovata reconstruction.jpg
| image_caption = O. ovata
| taxon = Odontopleura
| authority = Emmrich, 1839
| type_species = Odontopleura ovata
| type_species_authority = Emmrich, 1839
| subdivision_ranks = Species
| subdivision =
 O. callicera
 O. generalandersi Borowski, 2008
 O. markhami Edgecomb & Sherwin, 2001
 O. ovata Emmrich, 1839
}}Odontopleura is a genus of spinose odontopleurid trilobite in the family Odontopleuridae, and is the type genus of that family and of Odontopleurida.  The various species are found in Upper Ordovician to Middle Devonian marine strata throughout the world.  The best studied fossils are of the type species, O. ovata, from the Wenlock-aged Liteň Formation in Loděnice, in Bohemia, Czech Republic, and, southeastern Gotland, of Sweden.

 Distribution 
Fossils of Odontopleura'' have been found in:
Devonian
China, Floresta Formation, Altiplano Cundiboyacense, Colombia
Silurian
Canada (Northwest Territories, Quebec), China, the Czech Republic, Poland, United States (Iowa, New York)
Ordovician
United States (Indiana, Ohio, Virginia)

References 

Odontopleuridae
Odontopleurida genera
Silurian trilobites
Devonian trilobites
Silurian trilobites of Asia
Devonian trilobites of Asia
Fossils of China
Silurian trilobites of Europe
Fossils of Poland
Fossils of the Czech Republic
Ordovician trilobites of North America
Silurian trilobites of North America
Ordovician United States
Silurian United States
Silurian Canada
Fossils of Canada
Paleozoic life of the Northwest Territories
Paleozoic life of Quebec
Devonian trilobites of South America
Devonian Colombia
Fossils of Colombia
Floresta Formation
Ordovician first appearances
Devonian extinctions
Fossil taxa described in 1839